Jonathan Valdivia (born September 1, 1993, in Guadalajara, Jalisco) is a Mexican professional footballer who plays for Necaxa  of Ascenso MX.

References

External links

Liga MX players
Living people
1993 births
Mexican footballers
Footballers from Guadalajara, Jalisco
Association football midfielders
Club Necaxa footballers
Atlético Zacatepec footballers